Samurai sauce is a Belgian condiment prepared from mayonnaise, ketchup, and harissa or Sambal Oelek
 commonly served with French fries. The sauce is also popular and widely used throughout France, and is not to be confused with Algerian sauce (North Africa sauce). There is indeed a version also called Algerian sauce which is similar to Samurai sauce, but with onions. According to Harry Pearson, author of A Tall Man In A Low Land: Some Time Among the Belgians, mobile friteries in Belgium often have samurai sauce, with some making it their special item. In addition, many kebab restaurants have Samurai sauce as an available condiment.

References

Mayonnaise
Belgian sauces